Cartier station is located in Cartier, Ontario, which is served by Via Rail's Sudbury – White River train as a stop on request station. This railway station consists of a shelter equipped with heating, washrooms, and payphones.

See also
 List of designated heritage railway stations of Canada

External links
Via Rail page for Cartier train station

Via Rail stations in Ontario
Railway stations in Sudbury District
Designated heritage railway stations in Ontario
Canadian Pacific Railway stations in Ontario